In role-playing games, a status effect is a temporary modification to a game character’s original set of stats that usually comes into play when special powers and abilities (such as spells) are used, often during combat. It appears in numerous computer and video games of many genres, most commonly in role-playing video games. The term status effect can be applied both to changes that provide a character an advantage (increased attributes, defensive barriers, regeneration), and those that hinder the character (decreased attributes, incapacitation, degeneration). Especially in MMORPGs, beneficial effects are referred to as buffs, and hindering effects are called debuffs.

Acquiring and removing status effects
A status effect in the abstract is a persistent consequence of a certain in-game event or action, and as such innumerable variants exist across the gaming field. Status effects may result from one character performing a certain type of attack on another. Players may acquire status effects by consuming items, casting spells on themselves or each other, activating devices in the world, interacting with NPCs, or remaining in a particular location. Meeting certain criteria may result in the character acquiring a condition, which can have a status effect associated with it; for example: if their hunger level is high they may acquire a 'starving' condition, which produces a status effect that reduces their health regeneration. Some games offer permanent status effects which persist for an entire level and act as modifications to the game's native difficulty. 

The process of removing a status effect varies as widely as the effects themselves. Some status effects expire after a certain amount of time has elapsed. Most games contain items capable of healing specific status effects, or rarer items which can heal all of them. Many games also include magic spells that can eliminate status effects. Status effects are often removed at the end of a battle or once the originating enemy is defeated, however some may persist until they are explicitly cured. Games which allow players to rest may remove some status effects when that action is taken. If a game has multiple classes, one will often be a class capable of healing, who will have a greater ability to remove negative status effects than other classes.

In addition, many games have weapons, armor, or other equipment that can mitigate status effects or prevent a character from getting one in the first place. Depending on the game, some increase the chance to escape suffering the effect each time the player may potentially receive it, while others grant complete immunity. However, sometimes the equipment that is resisting an effect, will in exchange, as a penalty, increase vulnerability against a different effect, offering the player the opportunity to make tactical choices.

Buffs and debuffs
In many MMORPGs, the terms buff and debuff are commonly used to describe status effects. Some spells or powers may debuff an enemy while buffing an ally at the same time.

Buffs
Buff is the term generically used to describe a positive status effect that affects mainly player or enemy statistics (usually cast as a spell). Examples of buffs include:

 Increasing the movement speed of the target.
 Increasing the attack speed of the target.
 Increasing the health points of the target.
 Increasing the target's perception.
 Increasing the target's physical defense.
 Healing the target over time for a period of time.
 Boosting the damage output of the target.
 Taunting the enemy to avoid other players getting attacked.
 Stealth to avoid the enemy detecting or hitting the player

Debuffs
Debuffs are effects that may negatively impact a player character or a non-player character in some way other than reducing their hit points. Some examples of debuffs are:

 Reducing the movement speed of the target.
 Reducing the attack speed of the target.
 Decreasing the resistance of the target to various elements or forms of attack.
 Reducing the stats of the target.
 Crippling the target's perception.
 Lowering the target's physical defense.
 Draining the target's health capacity.
 Removing the target's health over time while the status effect is active.
 Making the character act on his/her own.
 Skipping the target's turn.
There are countless other debuffs, depending on the game played, though all share the same concept: to make a certain target less powerful in one or more aspects. Both buffs and debuffs are generally of a temporary nature, wearing off after a certain period of time.

Auras
Many modern real-time strategy games have hero units, single units that are powerful, but limited in number (usually only one of a single type allowed).  In addition to their normally very high stats, many heroes also have auras which confer beneficial status effects or attribute bonuses to any friendly units that enter within a certain radius of the hero.  This makes the hero unit an important factor in an engagement as, in addition to their formidable combat skills and powerful abilities, they also make the units around them more effective.

Some heroes and spellcaster units can also confer or inflict buffs, debuffs, and other status effects to units as spells.

See also
 MMORPG
 Dungeons & Dragons
 Pathfinder Roleplaying Game

References

External links
 Status Effects at Giant Bomb

Video game terminology